In grammar, accusative and infinitive (also Accusativus cum infinitivo or accusative plus infinitive, frequently abbreviated ACI or A+I) is the name for a syntactic construction first described in Latin and Greek, also found in various forms in other languages such as English and Spanish. 
In this construction, the subject of a subordinate clause is put in the accusative or objective case and the verb appears in the infinitive form.

Description
This construction can be illustrated in English:
 I believe him to be rich.
This contains a finite verb (believe) followed by a noun phrase in the accusative (him) and a non-finite verb (to be). Underlying the ACI section is the independent statement
 He is rich
which has become an embedded clause. Thus the accusative him is both the object of believe and the implicit subject of to be.

In Latin

The accusative and infinitive is the usual grammatical construction by means of which Classical Latin expressed indirect statements, that is, statements which report what someone has said, thought, felt, etc. Whereas a direct statement would be

"I am a good student," says Julia.

the indirect statement might be

Julia says that she is a good student.

Classical Latin tends not to use a conjunction equivalent to the English "that" to introduce indirect statements. Rather, an accusative subject is used with an infinitive to develop the appropriate meaning. For example, translating the aforementioned example into Latin:

literally: 'Julia says herself to be a good student.'

 here is an accusative reflexive pronoun referring back to the subject of the main verb i.e.  ;  is the infinitive "to be."

Note that the tense of the infinitive, translated into English, is relative to the tense of the main verb. Present infinitives, also called contemporaneous infinitives, occur at the time of the main verb. Perfect infinitives (prior infinitives) occur at a time before the main verb. Future infinitives (subsequent infinitives) occur at a time after the main verb.  For example, the contemporaneous infinitive in this sentence,

would still be translated "They said he was helping her," even though iuvāre is a present infinitive.

Passive periphrastic infinitives, i.e. the gerundive + , indicate obligatory action in indirect statements, e.g. , "Gaius says that the letters ought to be written by you."

This was probably the more common usage in spoken Latin and is the form used consistently in Jerome's Vulgate, which reflects a colloquial style. This is the origin of the construction in the modern Romance languages such as French:
Julia dit qu'elle est une bonne élève.

In English

In English, the ACI construction occurs with verbs of wishing, saying and perceiving, as well as in causative clauses. Depending on the valency of the main verb in the sentence, English may use the infinitive with or without the infinitive marker to.
 I would like the President to be successful.
 I saw her go.
 I wouldn't want them to think I'm unfair.
 I imagine that to be true.
 I believe there to be no alternative.
 She considers herself to have a fine reputation.
 She made me eat the vegetables.
 The teacher let the children go home early.
 Please don't have me get down on my knees.

In the framework of transformational grammar, the English construction is known as exceptional case-marking.

In Spanish
In Spanish, the ACI is used in causatives as well (Me obligó a mirarlo "He forced me to look at him") and in perception verbs (Los vi caminar por aquí "I saw them walk around here"), but it is not permitted in other cases. For example, in English one may say I told him to do it, but in Spanish one must say Le dije que lo hiciera "I said to him that he do it" (using the subjunctive mood), not *Le dije hacerlo or any other construction with the infinitive.

References

Sources
Klein, Maarten (2010) 'The accusative infinitive in Latin, English and Dutch.' In: Zwart, Jan-Wouter and Mark de Vries (eds.), Structure Preserved: Studies in syntax for Jan Koster. Linguistik Aktuell/Linguistics Today 164. Amsterdam: John Benjamins Publishing Company, 231-237

Latin grammar